Amphisbaena cegei is a species of amphisbaenian in the family Amphisbaenidae. The species is endemic to Bolivia.

Etymology
The specific name, cegei, is in honor of American herpetologist Carl Gans, based on his initials C. G.

Geographic range
A. cegei is found in Santa Cruz Department, Bolivia.

Habitat

Diet
A. cegei preys upon earthworms and termites.

Reproduction
A. cegei is oviparous.

References

Further reading
Dirksen L, De la Riva I (1999). "The lizards and amphisbaenians of Bolivia (Reptilia, Squamata): checklist, localities, and bibliography". Graellsia 55: 199-215.
Gans G (2005). "Checklist and Bibliography of the Amphisbaenia of the World". Bulletin of the American Museum of Natural History (289): 1-130. (Amphisbaena cegei, p. 13).
Montero, Ricardo; Sáfadez, Ingrid Fernádez [sic]; Álvarez, Lucindo Gonzales (1997). "A New Species of Amphisbaena from Bolivia". Journal of Herpetology 31 (2): 218-220. (Amphisbaena cegei, new species). (in English, with an abstract in Spanish).

cegei
Endemic fauna of Bolivia
Reptiles of Bolivia
Reptiles described in 1997